Yuliya Kliukova  (born 10 January 1982) is a Ukrainian freestyle skier. She was born in Ivano-Frankivsk. She competed at the 1998 Winter Olympics, in women's aerials.

References

External links 
 

1982 births
Sportspeople from Ivano-Frankivsk
Living people
Ukrainian female freestyle skiers
Olympic freestyle skiers of Ukraine
Freestyle skiers at the 1998 Winter Olympics